Liu Haimei (born 23 January 1971) is a Chinese sailor who competed in the 1996 Summer Olympics.

References

1971 births
Living people
Olympic sailors of China
Chinese female sailors (sport)
Sailors at the 1996 Summer Olympics – 470
Place of birth missing (living people)